Mel Ramsden (born 1944) is a British conceptual artist and member of the Art & Language artist group.

Life and work 
Ramsden was born in Ilkeston, Derbyshire, Great Britain. He studied at Nottingham College of Art from 1961 to 1963, went to Australia in 1963 and studied at the National Gallery School of Victoria from 1963 to 1964. In 1967 Ramsden moved to New York City in the United States and began the series of the Secret Paintings and the Two Black Squares.

Ramsden, along with Ian Burn, co-founded the Art Press and The Society for Theoretical Art and Analysis in New York City in 1969. Ramsden became a member of Art & Language in 1971.

As a member of Art & Language in 1972, Ramsden participated in Documenta 5 in Kassel with the project "Index 0001" in the department Idea + Idea/Light, together with the Art & Language artists Terry Atkinson, David Bainbridge, Ian Burn, Charles Harrison, Harold Hurrell, Michael Baldwin and Joseph Kosuth. With Art & Language he was also represented at Documenta 6 (1977), Documenta 7 in 1982 and Documenta X in 1997.

Since 1977, Baldwin and Ramsden have continued Art & Language as a project. In the meantime, an extensive body of work of objects and images has been created. Many texts were written with Charles Harrison and Michael Baldwin, who has been publishing "Art-Language" since 1971.

Ramsden currently lives in Middleton Cheney near Banbury, England.

References 

 Exhibition catalogue: documenta 5: Questioning reality - visual worlds today; catalogue (as file) Volume 1: (material); Volume 2: (list of exhibitions); Kassel 1972
 Documenta Archiv (ed.); Wiedervorlage d5 - Eine Befragung des Archivs zum documenta 1972; Kassel/Ostfildern 2001, 
 Catalogue for documenta 6: Volume 1: Painting, Sculpture/Environment, Performance; Volume 2: Photography, Film, Video; Volume 3: Hand Drawings, Utopian Design, Books; Kassel 1977 
 Catalogue: documenta 7 Kassel; Vol. 1: (Visual biographies of the artists); Vol. 2: (Current works of the artists); Kassel 1982 
 (documenta 10 catalogue): Politics - Poetics - the book for documenta X; Kassel/Ostfildern 1997,  (German) /  (English)
 Marzona, Daniel: Konzeptkunst; Cologne, 2005, 
 Kosuth, Joseph: "The Artist as Anthropologist", Art After Philosophy and After, MIT Press, 1991, p. 117

External links 

 Examples of his works
 Art & Language at the Lisson Gallery
 Art & Language: Blurting in A & L online
 Materials by and about Mel Ramsden in the documenta archive

1944 births
Living people
Art & Language
British conceptual artists
English contemporary artists
People from Ilkeston
English expatriates in Australia
English expatriates in the United States
Alumni of Nottingham Trent University
National Gallery of Victoria Art School alumni